Francisco Javier Suárez Regueiro (born 10 September 1977 in Asturias) is a cyclist from Spain.  He has a vision impairment. He competed at the 2000 Summer Paralympics in cycling.  He was the third cyclist to finish in the Tandem Road race.

References

External links 
 
 

1977 births
Living people
Spanish male cyclists
Paralympic cyclists of Spain
Paralympic bronze medalists for Spain
Paralympic medalists in cycling
Cyclists at the 2000 Summer Paralympics
Medalists at the 2000 Summer Paralympics
People from Avilés
Cyclists from Asturias